The Initiative for RECOM (Albanian: Nisma për KOMRA; Bosnian/ Croatian: Inicijativa za REKOM; English: Initiative for RECOM; Macedonian/ Serbian: Иницијатива за РЕКОМ; Slovenian: Pobuda za REKOM), full name Initiative for the establishment of a Regional Commission tasked with establishing the facts about all victims of war crimes and other serious human rights violations committed on the territory of the former Socialist Federal Republic of Yugoslavia in the period from January 1, 1991, to December 31, 2001, was an initiative to establish a regional commission for truth by agreement between the states of the former  Socialist Federal Republic of Yugoslavia.

The Initiative for RECOM is represented in public through the RECOM Reconciliation Network (until 2019, Coalition for RECOM), which is the largest network of non-governmental organizations (more than 2,200 members) in the countries of the former SFR Yugoslavia. In 2019, RECOM Reconciliation Network gave up further insistence on the successor states of the SFRY to establish an intergovernmental commission. On that occasion, it took care and responsibility to make a list of victims of the wars caused by the disintegration of SFR Yugoslavia. The coordinator of the RECOM Reconciliation Network is Nataša Kandić.

Organization

The highest legal act of the RECOM Reconciliation Network is the Statute. The RECOM Reconciliation Network is managed by the Assembly of Network Members. The members of the Assembly elect the members of the Regional Council.

The initiators, the Humanitarian Law Center from Belgrade, Documenta – Center for Dealing with the Past from Zagreb and Research and Documentation Center from Sarajevo, established the Coordination Council on May 9, 2008 in Podgorica. The first task of the Council was to form the Coalition for RECOM and to transfer the management of the consultative process to it. The Council was tasked with overseeing the implementation of the decisions of the Assembly of the Coalition for RECOM. The Coordinating Council ceased to exist with the establishment of the Regional Council. At the 7th session of the Assembly of the Coalition for RECOM held in Belgrade in 2014, at the suggestion of councilors, the Regional Council was formed, which today provides technical and professional support, and consists of civil society organizations participating in RECOM. Each state has one representative in the Regional Council, and the Council is also responsible for implementing the conclusions of the Assembly of the Coalition for RECOM. The Regional Council is headed by the Coordinator of the Coalition for RECOM.  In 2019, the Coalition for RECOM was reconstructed, and on that occasion the name was changed to RECOM Reconciliation Network.

Compositions of the Regional Council
The Regional Council is the highest governing body in the RECOM Reconciliation Network between the two Assemblies. It consists of seven representatives of civil society organizations from the states that emerged from the disintegration of SFR Yugoslavia. Its composition, election of members, manner of decision-making and competencies are regulated by the Statute. He is accountable to the Assembly of RECOM for his work. Members of the Regional Council present the RECOM Reconciliation Network in the public opinion.

Composition of the Team of Public advocates 

Public advocates are responsible for political advocacy. Through their public and active engagement in society and with politicians in their countries, they advocate and initiate support for the establishment of RECOM.

Regional forums and Assemblies 

Regional transitional justice forums in the post-Yugoslav countries deal with challenges, problems and aspects important for transitional justice in the post-conflict societies of the Western Balkans. Several hundred activists from the region attend each forum. As part of the forum, the Assembly of the RECOM Reconciliation Network also meets regularly.

References

External links 
 RECOM Reconciliation Network

Human rights
Organizations based in Serbia